The 10th Secretariat of the Communist Party of Vietnam (CPV), formally the 10th Secretariat of the Central Committee of the Communist Party of Vietnam (Vietnamese: Ban Bí thư Ban Chấp hành Trung ương Đảng Cộng sản Việt Nam Khoá X), was partly elected by a decision of the 10th Politburo and partly elected by the 1st Plenary Session of the 10th Central Committee (CC) in the immediate aftermath of the 10th National Congress.

Members

References

Bibliography

10th Secretariat of the Communist Party of Vietnam